Carex petasata is a species of sedge known by the common name Liddon sedge.

Distribution
This sedge is native to much of western North America, from Alaska and northwestern Canada to California and to New Mexico, where it grows in several habitat types, including dry and wet, and low to high elevation, woodland and grassland.

Description
Carex petasata produces dense clumps of stems up to about 85 centimeters in maximum height with several leaves per stem measuring up to 30 or 40 centimeters long.

The inflorescence is a light-colored open bundle of distinct flower spikes. The scale covering the female flower and the perigynium on the fruit are generally of pale color, white to cream to light brown.

External links
Jepson Manual Treatment - Carex petasata
Flora of North America
Carex petasata - Photo gallery

petasata
Flora of Western Canada
Flora of the Western United States
Flora of the Sierra Nevada (United States)
Flora of Alaska
Flora of California
Flora of New Mexico
Plants described in 1836
Flora without expected TNC conservation status